Good News in Hard Times is the album released by American gospel group The Sisters of Glory, released on August 22, 1995, by Warner Bros. Records. The set included solo performances by five female singers from different musical backgrounds: Thelma Houston, CeCe Peniston, Phoebe Snow, Lois Walden, and Albertina Walker.

The concept of their modern gospel ensemble was initially created by Lois Walden. For the first time, the vocalists performed together on April 25, 1994, at the New York benefit concert named "Gospel Music: From the Church to the Charts". The next gig for the gospel quintet was at the music festival Woodstock '94 on August 14, 1994. Later that year, on December 16, they appeared before Pope John Paul II at the Christmas at the Vatican II concert in Rome. After receiving an offer from Warner Bros management, the Sisters also recorded a studio album in common.

The album, produced by Jennifer Cohen in collaboration with Walden, earned positive to mixed reviews from music critics. With no song released in support either on promotional single, Good News in Hard Times charted on the U.S. Billboard Top 40 Gospel Albums at number twenty-nine.

Critical reception

Good News in Hard Times received positive to mixed reviews from critics. Dimitri Ehrlich from Entertainment Weekly graded the album with A−. Describing the product as "the funky, inspiring tour de force of classic black gospel", he highlighted Phoebe Snow's performance on the roof-raising "His Eye is on the Sparrow." People acknowledged the Sisters for sticking to gospel tradition, instead blending their music with contemporary pop or R&B elements. The magazine praised the Walker's version of "He's Right on Time" for presence of "the glorious spirit of Mahalia Jackson", Peniston's sassy soul strut on "How I Got Over" and, especially, "the touching, tear-jerking way of maternal love" provided by Walden on the song "No Charge". Allmusic gave the album three (out of five) stars with no particular comment.

Chart performance
On September 9, 1995, the album entered the U.S. Billboard Top Gospel Albums Chart, debuting at number thirty-four. After three weeks at the same position, plus one week at number thirty-nine, the set topped its chart run on July 10 at number twenty-nine, eventually. Overall, the album spent six weeks in the chart.

Track listing

Charts

Weekly charts

See also
 Gospel music

References

General

Specific

External links
 
 
 
 
 

1995 debut albums
Warner Records albums
Sisters of Glory albums